Pinkenba is a town and eastern coastal suburb within the City of Brisbane, Queensland, Australia.

Geography 
Pinkenba is a long narrow strip of land on the northern side of the Brisbane River, facing Moreton Bay,  from the Brisbane central business district. The area is spatially isolated from other residential suburbs and is bounded by the Brisbane Airport to west, Moreton Bay to the north, and the Brisbane River to the east.

The neighbourhood of Myrtletown is at the northern end of the suburb of Pinkenba.

The neighbourhood of Bulwer Island is in the centre of the suburb.

Pinkenba has the following headlands:

 Juno Point on Moreton Bay
 Luggage Point (also known as Uniacke Point) at the mouth of the Brisbane River

The land use is mostly industrial except for a small residential area at the town centre.

History
Pinkenba is situated in the Yugarabul traditional Aboriginal country. The Turrbal people are custodians within the Yugurabul traditional country. The name Pinkenba comes from the Turrbal word , which means "place of land tortoise".

The former suburb of Meeandah took its name from the now disused Meeandah railway station on the Pinkenba railway line, which in turn was named after a corruption of the Greek word meander, and referred to Serpentine Creek which flowed through the area, but has subsequently been converted into a drain due to the development of Brisbane Airport. The name is often thought to be an Aboriginal word.

Bulwer Island was named after Lord Edward Bulwer-Lytton who, as the British Secretary of State for the Colonies,   separated Queensland from New South Wales in 1859. As the name suggests, it was originally an island in the Brisbane River which became permanently attached to the mainland through a land reclamation project in the 1960s.

Boggy Creek State School opened on 22 February 1875. It was renamed Myrtle State School in 1888. In 1900, it was renamed Pinkenba State School. With student numbers falling to 6 students, the school was mothballed on 31 December 2008 and closed on 31 December 2010. It was located at 248 Eagle Farm Road, on the corner of Serpentine Road. The school's website was archived.

In 1892, the opening of the Queensland Meat Export and Agency Company's meatworks in Pinkenba necessitated the establishment of a town where workers could live close to their work. On 15 October 1892, there was an auction of 40 allotments of land in the new town of Pinkenba. That land was bounded by the present-day streets of McBride Road to the west, Serpentine Road to the north, and Eagle Farm Road to the south-east.

A postal receiving office was opened in 1892, becoming Pinkenba Post Office in 1897. In 1969, it was on the north-eastern corner of Hopper Street and McBride Street.

On Saturday 15 December 1900, auctioneers Isles, Love & Co offered 42 suburban allotments and seven farm sites for sale in the Cluya Road area.

In 1902, a Baptist church opened in Pinkenba. Prior to the opening of the church, the Baptist congregation met in Harris's Hall. A stump-capping ceremony for the new church was held on Monday 11 November 1901. The church officially opened on New Year's Day, 1 January 1902.

In 1902, a spur line was built from Pinkenba to the wharf, to facilitate the movement of goods. In 1909, a separate railway wharf was constructed.

Pinkenba Wharf was the point of embarkation for many World War I soldiers. The Pinkenba & District War Memorial commemorates those from the district who served and died in the war. The memorial was unveiled on 16 August 1919 by the Queensland Governor, Sir Hamilton Goold-Adams.

Pinkenba Presbyterian Church opened in 1915. In 1969, it was on the north-eastern corner of McBride Street and Esker Street. It was demolished circa 1980.

Pinkenba Rail Post Office opened at the Pinkenba railway station in mid 1915 and closed in April 1954.

Myrtletown State School opened on 1924 and closed on 19 February 1971. It occupied the northern part of the block bounded by Main Beach Road, School Road (now Lewandowski Drive) and Sandmere Street.

St Matthias' Anglican Church was dedicated on 14 February 1925 by Canon de Witt Batty. It closed circa 1981. It was located on the south-east corner of Hopper Street and McBride Road.

Myrtletown Methodist Church opened circa 1930. In 1969, it was on the western side of Myrtletown Road (now Main Myrtletown Road) between Rowlingson Street (no longer extant) and Priors Road (approx ). The church is no longer extant; its land is now part of the Brisbane Airport, just south of Qantas Hangar 3's carpark.

Qantas selected Pinkenba for its flying boat base in the 1930s. Until World War II, the other flying boat base, at Hamilton Reach, was too congested, but the Qantas base eventually moved upstream, providing better access for passengers.

During the war, a Royal Australian Navy Defence Station was established, with the remains of the facility listed on the current Queensland Heritage Register.  

On 6 March 1963, Queen Elizabeth II unveiled a roadside memorial at 315 Tingara Street (corner of Kirra Street). It commemorates the discovery of commercial quantities of oil in Australia at Moonie. The location was chosen because it was close to the site of the oil refinery which was to be built to process the oil. The memorial was designed sculptor Rod Shaw of Narrabeen, Sydney. The bas relief monement reflects the cooperation between the United States and Australia in the search for oil though the imagery of oil workers handling a drill bit with flags of the two countries in the background. Although significant oil deposits had been found at Moonie, the  pipeline to Brisbane was not completed until the following year.

Bulwer Island Oil Refinery commenced with a major land reclamation project on Bulwer Island in the Brisbane River, which was then a tidal mangrove swamp. During its operation, it was the largest oil refinery in Queensland. It was decommissioned in 2015 and now operates as an import terminal.

In 1975, Myrtletown (then an independent suburb) was downgraded to a neighbourhood within Pinkenba. Myrtletown was historically known as a residential and farming locality, though maritime and industrial facilities have developed in recent decades.

The median age of the Pinkenba population was 42 years, 5 years above the Australian median. Children aged under 15 years made up 15.4% of the population and people aged 65 years and over made up 12.8% of the population.  62.5% of people living in Pinkenba were born in Australia, compared to the national average of 69.8%; the next most common countries of birth were New Zealand 7%, Iran 6.8%, England 2.5%, Italy 1.4%, France 0.8%.  77.3% of people spoke only English at home; the next most popular languages were 2% Italian, 1.7% Cantonese, 1.1% Tagalog, 0.9% Afrikaans, 0.9% Serbo-Croatian/Yugoslavian. The most common religious affiliation was "No Religion" 22.8%; the next most common responses were Catholic 19.9%, Anglican 16.5%, Presbyterian and Reformed 5.4% and Uniting Church 4.3%.

, two cruise ship wharves for Brisbane are located there, with differing facilities. Portside Wharf at Hamilton was completed in 2006 and is an international-standard facility for cruise liners, offering restaurants, coffee shops, gift shops, and other facilities. However, due to the height restrictions of the Gateway Bridge, and length restriction of  that far upstream, larger cruise liners must dock further down the river at the more industrial multi-user terminal at the Port of Brisbane. In late 2020, the new Brisbane International Cruise Terminal was scheduled to open on the northern bank of the Brisbane River at Myrtletown, opposite the port, but its opening was delayed because of shut-down of the cruise industry due to the COVID-19 pandemic. The new cruise terminal is located at Luggage Point next to the Luggage Point sewage treatment plant (which has been renamed the Luggage Point Resource Recovery Centre). The new terminal will be able to accommodate the largest cruise vessels in the world. It will be operated by the port but will not be part of the suburb of Port of Brisbane (which is on the southern bank of the river).

Heritage listings 
Pinkenba has a number of heritage-listed sites, including:

 Pinkenba State School, 238 Eagle Farm Road
 Luggage Point Stores Buildings, 200 Main Beach Road (approx )
 Pinkenba War Memorial, opposite 16 Mcbride Street
 Former RAN Station 9 (also known as Myrtletown Boom Defence and Indicator Loop Control Centre), 51 Sandmere Road (Myrtletown Reserve)
 Former Pinkenba Police Station, 14 Serpentine Road
 Amoco Time Capsule, 323 Tingira Street

Economy 
Pinkenba is the site of BP's Bulwer Island Refinery (an import terminal since 2015), and Shell's Pinkenba Terminal. In 2011, Shell's operations at Bulwer Island were expanded, with the opening of a new bitumen and marine fuel import facility. Shell facilities include its Queensland state office, a bitumen plant, a lubricants and grease manufacturing facility, several warehouses and a fuel storage unit.

Education
There are no schools in Pinkenba. The nearest government primary school is Hamilton State School in Hamilton to the south-west. The nearest government secondary school is Aviation State High School in Hendra to the west.

Facilities 
Pinkenba Post Office is at  46-48 McBride Road.

Luggage Point Wastewater Treatment Plant is a sewage treatment plant.

Bulwer Island Power Station generates electricity from gas.

Numerous development projects have been proposed for the area, including residential developments and an immigration detention centre.

Attractions 
Pinkenba has a historical trail, which was designed on behalf of the Pinkenba Community Association and the Port of Brisbane with help from Brisbane City Council Neighbourhood planning team. More work has still to be done over the next ten years, involving the beautification of Pinkenba, with the first part being the local park and historical path and local pub.

Transport 
The suburb is accessed by road via Kingsford Smith Drive, which passes an industrial area before reaching the suburb. A railway  branch line to Pinkenba was constructed to encourage port development downstream away from the Brisbane central business district. The now-abandoned Pinkenba railway station opened in 1882 as the terminus of the line, and closed in 1993.
  
On the day of the 2011 census, 9.1% of employed people travelled to work on public transport and 63.6% by car (either as driver or as passenger).

See also

 List of Brisbane suburbs

References

Further reading

External links

 University of Queensland: Queensland Places:Pinkenba
 
 

 
Suburbs of the City of Brisbane